University Challenge is a British television quiz programme which first aired in 1962. University Challenge aired for 913 episodes on ITV from 21 September 1962 to 31 December 1987, presented by quizmaster Bamber Gascoigne. The BBC revived the programme on 21 September 1994 with Jeremy Paxman as the quizmaster. Paxman will relinquish his role as host following the conclusion of the 52nd series in 2023, after which he will be succeeded by Amol Rajan. In October 2022, an ITV documentary, Paxman: Putting Up With Parkinson's, revealed how the disease has impacted him and revealed that Paxman recorded his very last episode of University Challenge on 15 October 2022, which is to air sometime in 2023.

The current title holders are Imperial College London, who won the 51st series on 4 April 2022. 

The show has always been produced by the same company (originally named Granada Television, renamed ITV Studios in 2009 and renamed again Lifted Entertainment in 2021), under licence from Richard Reid Productions and the College Bowl Company. It was recorded at Granada Studios in Manchester from its inception until the studios closed down in 2013; it is now recorded at Dock10 studios in Salford.

History

Format continuity
Despite periodic changes to the sets, studio layout, and presentation, University Challenge has preserved a high level of continuity from 1962 to the present. Some commentators have cited this as an essential element of its success. Elements of this continuity include:
The longevity of its quizmasters, with only two presenters in the programme's history;
The split-screen presentation during the starter question phase, which appears to place one team physically above the other. In the final years of the original Bamber Gascoigne era, the studio set genuinely was two-tiered, although the split-screen effect returned for the revived series and has been used ever since;
Long serving voiceover announcers, with only three in the programme's history – Don Murray-Henderson from 1962 until his death in 1971, then Jim Pope until his death in 2001, then Roger Tilling. Tilling's delivery typically becomes increasingly high-pitched as the episode progresses;
The theme tune "College Boy" by Derek New, which has been with the series since the 1960s (although the first series used "Ting A Ling" by Duke Ellington). "College Boy" was originally scored for an ensemble of tubular bells, flugelhorn, harpsichord, brushed hi-hat, bass drum and double bass. The original theme returned for the early Paxman-era episodes, and was later replaced by a string quartet arrangement of the theme recorded by the Balanescu Quartet.

ITV (1962 to 1987)
The programme had its beginnings in an American television quiz show called College Bowl. Cecil Bernstein, brother of Sidney Bernstein who founded Granada Television in 1954, had seen the programme in the United States and liked the format. It was decided that Granada would produce a similar programme with competing teams from universities across the United Kingdom. From its inception in 1962, University Challenge was hosted by Bamber Gascoigne, who died in 2022. The show was a cult favourite with a small but loyal core audience, and was one of a select few ITV programmes that was transmitted without any advertising breaks. Originally, the series started off in many areas, being broadcast at peak times or just after the nightly news around 22:30; by the early 1970s, the series was relegated to irregular timeslots by the various ITV regional companies, with some broadcasting the show during daytime, at weekends or late at night. In the absence of a regular networked slot, audience figures would often fall, leading the producers to make changes to the long-standing format of the programme. LWT stopped broadcasting the show in October 1983, with Thames following suit shortly afterwards. The programme was not broadcast in 1985 and returned in April 1986, when it was finally networked by ITV and broadcast at 15:00 on weekdays. The gameplay was revised, initial games were staged over two legs; the first in the classic format and the second played as a relay, where contestants selected questions from specific categories such as sport, literature and science, passing a baton between players whenever a "lap" of two correct answers was scored. The final series was also networked, but broadcast around 11:00 during the summer holiday period. Even so, the new networked time did little to save the series from the axe. The last ITV series was broadcast in 1987.

The Universities of Oxford and Cambridge could each enter up to five of their constituent colleges as separate teams, which are not themselves universities: they have far fewer students – numbering in the hundreds rather than thousands – than most universities. This was one ostensible inspiration for a 1975 protest, in which a team from the University of Manchester (which included David Aaronovitch) came second to Downing College, Cambridge, when they started a round by answering every question "Che Guevara", "Marx", "Trotsky" or "Lenin", in the hope of making the resulting show unbroadcastable.
It was, however, broadcast, although only portions of the episode still exist in the Granada Television archives. Granada subsequently banned the University of Manchester for several years.

BBC
University Challenge was revived by the BBC in 1994, although still produced by Granada Television (branded since 2009 as ITV Studios), using the original format, with minor differences, and presented by Jeremy Paxman.

During the show's hiatus, a special edition of the show was made by the BBC, as part of a themed evening of programmes dedicated to Granada Television. It was presented by Bamber Gascoigne and broadcast on BBC2 on 28 December 1992. The teams included one of students from Keble College, Oxford, which had fielded the winning team in the final 1987 season, and a graduates team of celebrity alumni who had previously appeared on the programme as students, including journalist John Simpson and actor Stephen Fry. This show was preceded by a short documentary about the show's history. Bamber Gascoigne's final appearance as host was in Universe Challenge in 1998 (see below).

Postgraduates
Since its revival in 1994, the programme has featured a number of teams of postgraduate and mature students, whose participation has been criticised. The Open University won the 1999 series with a team with an average age of 46. In the quarter-final, they narrowly beat a slightly younger team from part-time and mature student specialist Birkbeck, University of London. Birkbeck won the competition in 2003, also with a substantially mature team. Host Jeremy Paxman said that the Open University team was "not in the spirit" of the competition. The team publicly replied by challenging him to specify in what way this was "contrary to the spirit of the quiz – or of the university".

Ineligible contestants
In 2009, Sam Kay, part of the team from Corpus Christi College, Oxford, was accused of not being a student when the show was filmed. Kay, who had completed a chemistry degree the previous summer, had been planning to go on to study for a Doctor of Philosophy, but dropped out as he did not have sufficient funding. He then became an accountant. The team, whose captain Gail Trimble was dubbed the "human Google", won the competition but was subsequently disqualified and the trophy awarded to the runners-up, the University of Manchester.

A few days later, it was also revealed that Charles Markland, a member of the 2008 winning team from Christ Church, Oxford, had transferred his studies to Balliol College halfway through the series. He said that his team captain had contacted a researcher concerning the situation, and had been told that this was not a problem and that the same team should be maintained for continuity purposes. It was also revealed that Freya McClements, captain of the 2004 winning team from Magdalen College, Oxford, was at the time studying at Trinity College, Dublin. Although it was mentioned in a BBC news story at the time, no action was taken because the BBC stated that the facts had not been brought to their attention.

Editing
In 2016, at the Henley Literary Festival, Jeremy Paxman said that, when students were unable to answer several consecutive starter questions, those questions were often deleted before the show is broadcast.

In popular culture
In an episode of the BBC comedy series Not the Nine O'Clock News, first broadcast on 15 December 1980, Griff Rhys Jones plays Bamber Gascoigne in a sketch that pitches two teams of criminals representing prisoners from Wormwood Scrubs and Parkhurst. The teams score "points" (remission of sentence) by "grassing" on possible suspects involved in a crime.
In 1984 an episode of The Young Ones, entitled "Bambi" (a play on Bamber Gascoigne's name), centred on a parody of University Challenge with a match between the fictitious teams of Scumbag College and Footlights College, Oxbridge. The cast included Stephen Fry, who participated in the real competition in 1980 while at Cambridge, and fellow alumni and Footlights members Emma Thompson and Hugh Laurie as part of the "Footlights College" team, and Griff Rhys Jones as the host. The teams are arranged physically one above the other, in a parody of the show's split-screen format.
A quiz themed around BBC science fiction situation comedy Red Dwarf, broadcast in 1998, is entitled Universe Challenge. It opens as if it were a regular episode, but with Chris Barrie impersonating Jeremy Paxman. Gascoigne comes from behind with a blaster gun and blows him out of the chair to take over as host. This was Gascoigne's last appearance as host.
In a list of the 100 Greatest British Television Programmes drawn up by the British Film Institute in 2000, voted for by industry professionals, University Challenge was placed 34th.
 Starter For Ten is the title of a novel, first published in 2003, by British author David Nicholls. The plot is about a first-year student, Brian Jackson, who attempts to join his university team competing in University Challenge. Nicholls also adapted the novel into the film Starter for 10 in 2006, starring James McAvoy as Jackson, with Mark Gatiss portraying Gascoigne.
In 2006 Armando Ianucci's Time Trumpet presented a parody of University Challenge, set in a future where students are 'too lazy to learn'; this parody was later referenced in an episode of the 2007–08 series of University Challenge by the team captain of SOAS, Joe Perry, who, not knowing the real answer, simply answered "Venezuela?"
The quiz was the subject of the hour-long BBC Two documentary The Story So Far, first broadcast in November 2006. 
 In 2014, a two part documentary narrated by Richard Osman called 'Class of 2014' outlined a brief history of the programme and the team selection process both within the universities and by the production staff. The documentary attracted some criticism due to the large emphasis on Oxbridge and Manchester during the programme.
 In March 2017 semi-finalist team captains Bobby Seagull of Emmanuel College, Cambridge, and Eric Monkman of Wolfson College, Cambridge, appeared on BBC One's The One Show. In August 2017 the two were featured on BBC Radio 4's Today programme ahead of hosting their own show, Monkman and Seagull's Polymathic Adventure, on 21 August.

Game play

Teams
Teams consist of four members and most represent a single university. The exceptions to this are colleges of the University of Oxford and the University of Cambridge, which enter independent teams. While a number of other British universities have constituent colleges, only those where some teaching is undertaken at the college level may enter independent teams. The competing teams each year are selected by the show's producers, based both on scores from a general trivia quiz and the producers' judging of the suitability of the teams for television. Durham University has appeared most frequently in the post-1994 format.

The contestants are identified by their surnames during gameplay, apart from at the beginning when they introduce themselves with their full names, where they are from and what they are studying.

The teams generally consist of mixed genders, mostly young adults but with some mature students also appearing.

Tournament structure
The current tournament format used for each series is that of a direct knockout tournament starting with 28 teams. The fourteen first-round winners progress directly to the last sixteen. Two matches, involving the four highest scoring losing teams from the first round, whose losing scores often exceed winning scores in other first-round matches, fill the remaining places in the last sixteen. Teams in the quarter-final round (last eight teams) have to win two matches in the round to progress to the semi-finals. Equally, teams must lose two quarter-final matches in order to be eliminated from that round. The pairings for matches are often chosen in order to keep stronger teams apart.

Question format
Starter questions are answered individually and are worth ten points. The catchphrase "your starter for ten" inspired David Nicholls' 2003 novel Starter for Ten and the 2006 film based on it starring James McAvoy. An incorrect interruption of a starter question incurs a five-point penalty; during the Gascoigne era this took the form of five points being awarded to the opposing team, whereas in the Paxman era five points are deducted from the interrupting team.

The team answering a starter correctly gets a set of three bonus questions worth a potential fifteen points, for which they can confer. Sets of bonus questions are thematically linked. They rarely share a connection with the preceding starter question, except when they are bonuses following a picture or music question. Generally, there are three separate bonus questions worth five points each, but occasionally a bonus will require the enumeration of a given list with five, ten or fifteen points given for correctly giving a certain number of items from the list (for example, "there are seven fundamental SI units. Give five for five points, six for ten points or all seven for fifteen points"). It is the team captain's responsibility to give the answer to the bonus questions unless another member of the team is specified with the phrase "Nominate [name]". The team member so named may then give the answer instead.

In the course of a game there are two picture rounds (occurring roughly one quarter and three-quarters of the way through) and one music round (at the halfway point), where the subsequent bonuses are connected thematically to the starter; if a picture or music starter is not correctly answered, the accompanying bonus questions are held back until a normal starter is correctly answered. Usually, in the recent contests, the first picture round focuses on science and technology, geography, and languages, while the second picture round focuses on art, film, television, and literature. The 2010 Manchester University team included a visually impaired student, Rachael Neiman, and the picture rounds in episodes involving the team were word puzzles for which she was provided with Braille transcriptions. Pieces of music played for the music round may be classical or popular – for example, on 25 July 2011, the pieces played were winners of the Eurovision Song Contest. Occasionally, audio clips other than music (e.g. speech, animal sounds or other field recordings) are used.

The pace of questioning gradually increases through the show. The sound of a gong signals the end of the game. At this point, the game immediately ends, even if Paxman is halfway through asking a question. In the event of a tied score at the sound of the gong, a sudden death question is asked, the first team to answer correctly being deemed the winner; this is repeated until one or other of the teams answers correctly, or a team loses by giving an incorrect interruption. The ending of the programme is usually signified with Jeremy Paxman saying "It's goodbye from ([name of losing team], who say goodbye), it's goodbye from ([name of winning team], likewise), and it's goodbye from me: goodbye!"

Production
While the starter questions are being read out, the teams are shown on screen one above the other by means of a split-screen effect. When a player buzzes in, the shot zooms in to that player, accompanied by a voiceover identifying the player by team and surname, for example "Nottingham, Munro". The voiceovers are performed live in the studio by Roger Tilling and become more energetic towards the end of the programme. The 1986 series experimented with an actual two-tier set, which was discontinued the following year.

Notable contestants

Notable contestants in the regular student competition. Special Celebrity Christmas editions, where all competitors are distinguished, are excluded.Entertainers
Stephen Fry – Queens' College, Cambridge, 1980
Clive James – Pembroke College, Cambridge, 1968
Miriam Margolyes – Newnham College, Cambridge, 1963
John Sessions – reserve for UCNW Bangor, 1973
June Tabor – St Hugh's College, Oxford, 1968
The Wizard of New Zealand (Ian Brackenbury Channell) – University of Leeds, 1963
Authors
Sebastian Faulks – Emmanuel College, Cambridge, 1972
Julian Fellowes – Magdalene College, Cambridge, 1969
David Starkey – Fitzwilliam College, Cambridge
Politicians
Tim Boswell – New College, Oxford
Kwasi Kwarteng – Trinity College, Cambridge, 1995
David Lidington – Sidney Sussex College, Cambridge, 1978
David Mellor – Christ's College, Cambridge
Mary Robinson – Trinity College Dublin, 1966
Malcolm Rifkind – University of Edinburgh, 1967
Journalists
David Aaronovitch – Victoria University of Manchester, 1975
John Authers – University College, Oxford, 1987
Christopher Hitchens – Balliol College, Oxford, 1968
Charles Moore – Trinity College, Cambridge, 1978
John Simpson – Magdalene College, Cambridge, 1964
Others
Daisy Christodoulou (Education) – University of Warwick, 2007
Mark Labbett (Quizzer) – University of Glamorgan, 1997
Jenny Ryan (Quizzer) – University of Leeds, 2003
Dorjana Širola (Quizzer) – Somerville College, Oxford, 2002
Gail Trimble (Academic) – Corpus Christi College, Oxford, 2009

Winners
The University of Manchester, Magdalen College, Oxford, and Imperial College London have the highest number of wins, with four each. The University of Manchester and Magdalen College, Oxford are also the only teams to successfully defend the title the year after their win (Manchester's 2009 win came only after the original winner was disqualified). Trinity College, Cambridge, holds three titles, and a further seven institutions have two titles: Durham, Sussex, the Open University, Sidney Sussex–Cambridge, Keble–Oxford, University–Oxford and Warwick. At the time of Magdalen College, Oxford's third win in 2004, no other institution had won more than twice; the trophy in use since 1994 was given to the college in perpetuity and a new once created for use from 2005. 

Original series (Bamber Gascoigne)

New series (Jeremy Paxman)

Most series wins

Information in these tables obtained from Blanchflower – University Challenge Series Champions.

Lowest scores
Little is known about the lowest scores from the Bamber Gascoigne series, except that the lowest score ever was in the 1971–72 season, when the University of Sussex, fresh from two series wins, managed only 10 points. However, a low score was also achieved by Victoria University of Manchester in their first round match in 1975 when, for much of the recording, they answered only with the names of Marxists as a protest against the Oxford and Cambridge colleges being able to enter separate teams.

Under Jeremy Paxman, the lowest score achieved by a student team is also 10 which, coincidentally, was also achieved by a team from the University of Sussex, in the first round of the 2021–22 series when they faced the University of Birmingham who scored 245. In the same series, the lowest winning score for a student team was achieved, by Emmanuel College, Cambridge, who scored 85 in a quarter final against King's College London who scored 80. The second lowest losing score is 15, which was achieved by the University of Exeter in a 2008–09 quarter-final against Corpus Christi, Oxford, whose team captain Gail Trimble amassed 15 correct starter questions. However, the Corpus Christi team were later disqualified from the competition after it was found that team member Sam Kay had been ineligible for the last three matches. Therefore, the second lowest score officially achieved against eligible opponents under quizmaster Jeremy Paxman was by Lincoln College, Oxford, who totalled 30 in a semi-final against the eventual series champions the University of Manchester, in an episode televised on 9 February 2009, just two weeks after the Corpus Christi vs Exeter match. This was also matched in the grand final by St John's College, Oxford, against Peterhouse, Cambridge, on 18 April 2016.

Before these matches, the lowest score was 35, reached by New Hall, Cambridge, 1997. This score would have been lower if all fines for incorrect interruptions had been applied.

The lowest score during the Professionals series was achieved by the House of Commons team, who scored 25 in 2003. In the 2014 Christmas University Challenge series, a team of alumni from Newcastle University also finished with 25.

An all-time record low score for the series was achieved in the final of the 2017 Christmas series, when Keble College, Oxford, beat the University of Reading 240–0. The previous year's Christmas series saw the lowest winning score of all time, 75, scored by the University of Nottingham, who defeated their opponents, the University of Bristol, by just five points.

Highest scores
University College, Oxford, scored 520 points in the final ITV season in 1987.
In the Jeremy Paxman era, the team from Open University scored the highest score, 415, in the semi-final in 1997 against Charing Cross and Westminster Medical School.

Specials

Some information from this table was obtained from the web pages listed in 

Transmissions

ITV series

BBC series

Spin-off shows
The producers of the programme have taken the more recent inclusion of mature students to its logical conclusion by making two series without any student participants: University Challenge Reunited (2002) brought former teams back together, while University Challenge: The Professionals (from 2003) matched occupational groups such as civil servants, architects and doctors against each other. In 2003, the former was won by the 1979 team from Sidney Sussex College, Cambridge, the latter by a team from the Inland Revenue. The 2004 Professionals series was won by the British Library, and the 2005 series by the Privy Council Office. In 2006, Professionals was won by staff of the Bodleian Library of the University of Oxford.

The show has seen numerous specials, including those for specific professions and celebrity editions, such as Universe Challenge, presented by former host and Red Dwarf fan, Bamber Gascoigne, where the cast of Red Dwarf challenged a team of their "ultimate fans" to celebrate Red Dwarf's 10th anniversary on the air. The cast was Chris Barrie (captain), Danny John-Jules, Robert Llewellyn, Chloë Annett and Craig Charles. The cast, who at times seemed amazed at the fans' knowledge, lost, but by only 15 points, 280–295.

Similar programmesSixth Form Challenge, hosted by Chris Kelly, appeared briefly between 1965 and 1967. The sixth form contestants represented leading public schools and grammar schools. An untelevised version, Schools' Challenge, continues to run at junior and senior secondary school levels.

Challenging Times was a quiz show for teams representing higher education institutes in Ireland, televised by RTÉ from 1991 to 2001.

Other countriesUniversity Challenge ran in New Zealand for 14 seasons, from 1976 until 1989, with international series held between the previous years' British and New Zealand champions in both 1986 and 1987. It originally aired on TVNZ 1 and was hosted by Peter Sinclair from 1976 to 1977 and again from 1980 to 1989. From 1978 to 1979, Sinclair was briefly dropped from the show and was replaced by University of Otago lecturer Charles Higham, Sinclair returned in 1980 and from 1981 to 1982, the show briefly moved to TVNZ 2, it moved back to TV1 in 1983 and remained on the network until the series original conclusion in 1989. The series was revived in 2014 by Cue TV and aired on Prime with Cue TV owner Tom Conroy as host and ran until its second conclusion in 2017.University Challenge, hosted by Magnus Clarke, ran in Australia on the ABC from 1987 until 1989. In the 1988 series, the University of New South Wales defeated the University of Melbourne in the final by 245 points to 175.University Challenge India started in summer 2003, with the season culminating in the finals of March 2004 where Sardar Patel College of Engineering (SPCE), Mumbai, beat Indian School of Business (ISB), Hyderabad. The 2004–2005 season finale saw a team of undergraduate engineering students from Netaji Subhas Institute of Technology (NSIT), Delhi, beat a team of management students from the Indian Institute of Management Kozhikode. The Indian winners of the 2003–2004 season went on to beat the finalists from the UK show, Gonville and Caius College, Cambridge. UC India is produced by BBC World India, and Synergy Communications, co-owned by Siddhartha Basu, who also hosted the show.

Notes

External links
Southampton 'University Challenge' team interview – a rare insight into the personalities of a University Challenge team

Sean Blanchflower's University Challenge pages
University Challenge, with photograph of the highest-ever scoring team, from University College, Oxford, in the 1987 final against Keble College, Oxford at UKGameshows.com
A full, illustrated behind-the-scenes account of the matches of the lowest-ever scoring team in the Paxman-era, by an Exeter contestant
University Challenge India – a tribute
Interview with the winning 2007 University of Warwick team
 
 
BBC Tightens University Challenge Rules in Response to Fiasco

 
1962 British television series debuts
1960s British game shows
1970s British game shows
1980s British game shows
1990s British game shows
2000s British game shows
2010s British game shows
2020s British game shows
BBC television game shows
English-language television shows
British television series based on American television series
ITV game shows
Quiz games
Student quiz television series
Television shows produced by Granada Television
Television series by ITV Studios
Universities in the United Kingdom